Dipterocarpus indicus is a species of large tree in the family Dipterocarpaceae endemic to the Western Ghats of India. It is recognised as an endangered species under the IUCN Red List of Threatened Species 2021.

Description 
These are emergent trees that can attain height about 50 m and girth up to 2 m. Leaves are simple and show alternate phyllotaxy. Mostly seen as clustered towards the end of branches. They are pubescent when young and glabrous when mature. Size: 8-20 × 6-10 cm. Leaf shape can be described as broadly elliptic or ovate. Leaf apex is shortly acuminate. Ten to thirteen pairs of strong and parallel secondary nerves are seen. Petiole length is about 3 cm.

Flowers are white and seen in axillary racemes. Fruits are smooth with 3 short and 2 long, enlarged, wing like, persistent calyx lobes.

Distribution 
This is a rare tree seen in low and medium elevation evergreen forests of Western Ghats from Northern Karnataka to Southern Kerala. Elevation range is from 400 m to 900 m.

References 

indicus
Endemic flora of India (region)
Flora of Karnataka
Flora of Kerala
Flora of Tamil Nadu
Endangered flora of Asia